Ramdeo Verma also known as Ramdeo Mahto was an Indian politician, belonging to the Communist Party of India (Marxist). Verma served as a member of the Bihar Legislative Assembly from Bibhutipur from 1980 to 1985 and 1990 to 2010. His wife Manju Prakash also served as a member of the Bihar Legislative Assembly from Buxar (Vidhan Sabha constituency) from 1990 to 2000. He was a leader of the communist movement in the region of Bibhutipur, popularly known as 'Moscow' of Samastipur. He belonged to Kushwaha community and was known for championing the cause of the weaker sections'. His membership with CPIM ended in November 2020. After 2020 November, he joined Communist Party of India (Marxist-Leninist) Liberation.

Electoral Result 
Ramdeo Verma took part in Bihar Vidhan Sabha Election from Bibhutipur each time between 1980 and 2015. He served as MLA from 1980 to 1985 and 1990 to 2010.

He had also unsuccessfully contested in 2009 and 2014 Indian general election from Ujiarpur.

References

Communist Party of India (Marxist–Leninist) Liberation politicians
Communist Party of India (Marxist) politicians from Bihar
Communist Party of India (Marxist) candidates in the 2014 Indian general election
Living people
1947 births